Live is the first live DVD by American rock band Godsmack. Released in 2001, the DVD has been certified Gold by the RIAA, with access sales of 50,000 copies in the United States. It was filmed at Centrum in Worcester, in Worcester, Massachusetts on March 2, 2001.

Track listing
 "Opening"
 "Awake"
 "Sick of Life"
 "Vampires" 
 "Bad Magick"
 "Bad Religion"
 "Mistakes"
 "Greed"
 "Trippin'"
 "Get Up, Get Out!"
 "Spiral"
 "Keep Away"
 "Voodoo"
 "Whatever"

Personnel
 Sully Erna – vocals, rhythm guitar, additional drums
 Tony Rombola – lead guitar, additional vocals
 Robbie Merrill – bass, additional vocals
 Tommy Stewart – drums

References

Godsmack video albums
2001 live albums
2001 video albums
Live video albums